Pavetta tarennoides is a species of plant in the family Rubiaceae. It is endemic to Kenya.

References

Flora of Kenya
tarennoides
Endemic flora of Kenya
Taxonomy articles created by Polbot
Critically endangered flora of Africa